"But You Don't Care" is a song by New Zealand group Mi-Sex, released in June 1979 as the lead single from their debut studio album, Graffiti Crimes (1979). 
The song was the band's first on CBS records and became the band's first charting single, peaking at number 33 in New Zealand and 25 in Australia.

Music video
The video places the band members amongst oversized pieces on a giant chess board.

Track listings
Australia/New Zealand 7" (BA 222542)
 "But You Don't Care" - 3:58	
 "Burning Up" - 3:02

Charts

References

New Zealand songs
Mi-Sex songs
1979 singles
1979 songs
CBS Records singles